The McAlester Scottish Rite Temple, also known as Masonic Temple or the McAlestor Consistory, is a building in McAlester, Oklahoma that was built in 1907 and 1928–1930.  It was listed on the National Register of Historic Places in 1980.

It is the oldest Masonic building in Oklahoma.

The 1928–1930 construction yielded an "impressive" brick and stone building.  It was built around a consistory that dated back to 1907.

References

External links
 McAlester Scottish Rite Masonic Center - official site

Clubhouses on the National Register of Historic Places in Oklahoma
Masonic buildings completed in 1907
Masonic buildings completed in 1930
Buildings and structures in Pittsburg County, Oklahoma
Masonic buildings in Oklahoma
Art Deco architecture in Oklahoma
National Register of Historic Places in Pittsburg County, Oklahoma